The Panther of Batignolles was an organized group of anarchists in France in the late 19th century.  Its members included Clément Duval.

See also
 Anarchism in France

External links
 Ernest Alfred Vizetelly, The Anarchists: Their Faith and Their Record Turnbull and Spears Printers, Edinburgh, 1911.

Panther